Stade Said Mohamed Cheikh is a multi-use stadium in Mitsamiouli, Comoros. It is currently used mostly for football matches.

History
It was opened in 2007 as part of FIFA's Win in Africa with Africa program. It is named after former Comoros head, Said Mohamed Cheikh.  It replaced Stade de Beaumer as the home of the Comoros national football team. It was the first stadium in the Comoros to host a CAF Champions League match.

References

External links
Stadium information

Football venues in the Comoros
2007 establishments in the Comoros